The United States Air Force's 285th Civil Engineering Squadron (285 CES) is an Air National Guard civil engineering unit located at St Croix ANGS.

History
On 7 May 1980 the 285th Combat Communications Flight (CMBTCF) was established, creating the first unit of the Virgin Islands Air National Guard.  The flight was upgraded to a squadron in 1996 and made a name for itself following the devastation of Hurricane Hugo to the region in 1989, when the unit and its installation became the heart of recovery operations for St. Croix.

Over the years, the unit has been involved in several contingency operations, to include Joint Endeavor, Uphold Democracy, Joint Forge, and both Iraqi and Enduring Freedom.

On 3 March 2012 the unit was redesignated a Civil Engineer Squadron after losing its communications mission.

Assignments

Major command/gaining command
 Air National Guard/ (???- ???)

Wing/group
 226th Combat Communications Group (1980–?)

Previous designations
 285th Combat Communications Flight (1980–1996)
 285th Combat Communications Squadron (1996–3 March 2012)
 285th Civil Engineer Squadron (3 March 2012 – present)

Bases stationed
 St Croix ANGS, Virgin Islands (1980–Present)

Decorations
Air Force Outstanding Unit Award 
 1989
 1 January 1990 - 31 December 1990
 1991
 1 September 1995 – 31 August 1997

Gallery

References

External links

Squadrons of the United States Air National Guard
Communications squadrons of the United States Air Force
1980 establishments in the United States Virgin Islands